A partial list of notable artists born or active in Ukraine, arranged chronologically with artists born in the same year arranged alphabetically within that year.

Born before 1800 
 Ivan Rutkovych (c.1650-c.1708), icon painter
 Dmitry Levitzky (1735–1822), portrait painter
 Anton Losenko (1737–1773), painter
 Ivan Martos (1754–1835), sculptor
 Vladimir Borovikovsky (1757–1825), painter

Born 1800 to 1849 
 Ivan Soshenko (1807–1876), painter
 Apollon Mokritsky (1810–1870), painter
 Taras Shevchenko (1814–1861), painter, poet
 Kostyantyn Trutovsky (1826–1893), painter
 Alexander Litovchenko (1835–1890), painter
Wilhelm Kotarbiński (1848–1921), painter
 Arkhip Kuindzhi (1842–1910), landscape painter
 Volodymyr Orlovsky (1842–1914), landscape painter
 Ilya Repin (1844–1930), painter
 Nikolai Yaroshenko (1846–1898), painter
 Leonid Pozen (1849–1921), painter, sculptor

Born 1850 to 1899 
 Nikolai Dmitriyevich Kuznetsov (1850–1930), painter
 Ivan Pohitonov (1850–1923), painter
 Kyriak Kostandi (1852–1921), painter, scholar
 Serhii Vasylkivsky (1854–1917), painter
 Opanas Slastion (1855–1933), graphic artist
 Ivan Seleznyov (1856–1936), painter
 Serhiy Svetoslavsky (1857–1931), landscape painter
 Marie Bashkirtseff (1858–1884), painter, sculptor
 Anton Vasyutinsky (1858–1935), painter, designer
 Mykola Samokysh (1860–1944), painter
 Mykhaylo Berkos (1861–1919), landscape painter
 Mykola Pymonenko (1862–1912), painter
 Ivan Yizhakevych (1864–1962), painter, writer
 David Ossipovitch Widhopff (1867–1933), painter, poster artist
 Pyotr Nilus (1869–1943), painter, writer
 Ivan Trush (1869–1941), painter
 Seraphima Blonskaya (1870–1947), teacher, painter
 Mykola Burachek (1871–1942), Socialist Realism painter
 Vasyl Krychevsky (1873–1952), painter, architect
 Oleksandr Murashko (1875–1919), painter
 Mikhaylo Parashchuk (1878–1963), sculptor
 Boris Vladimirski (1878–1950), painter
 Fedir Krychevsky (1879–1947), painter
 Kazimir Malevich (1879–1935), painter
 Alexander Bogomazov (1880–1930), painter
 Arnold Lakhovsky (1880–1937), painter, sculptor
 David Burliuk (1882–1967), Futurist painter
 Aleksandra Ekster (1882–1949), painter, designer
 Isaak Brodsky (1883–1939), painter
 Alexis Gritchenko (1883–1977), painter
 Vadym Meller (1884–1962), artist, theatre designer
 Oleksii Shovkunenko (1884–1974), painter, teacher
 Sonia Delaunay (1885–1979), cofounder of the Orphism movement
 Wladimir Burliuk (1886–1917), book illustrator
 John D. Graham (1886–1961), painter
 Heorhiy Narbut (1886–1920), graphic designer
 Olga Rozanova (1886–1918), painter
 Alexander Archipenko (1887–1964), sculptor, graphic artist
 Chana Orloff (1888–1968), sculptor
 Victor Palmov (1888–1929), painter
 Nathan Altman (1889–1970), stage designer, book illustrator
 Alexander Osmerkin (1892–1953), painter, graphic artist
 Louis Lozowick (1892–1973), painter, printmaker
 Nina Genke-Meller (1893–1954), artist
 Mykhailo Andriienko-Nechytailo (1894–1982), painter, stage designer
 Emmanuel Mane-Katz (1894–1962), painter
 Vasyl Yermylov (1894–1968), painter, designer
 Alexander Khvostenko-Khvostov (1895–1967), artist, stage designer
 Yefim Golyshev (1897–1970), painter, composer
 Vladimir Bobri (1898–1986), illustrator
 Abraham Mintchine (1898–1931), painter
 Grigoriy Dovzhenko (1899–1980), muralist

Born 1900 to 1949 

 Kateryna Vasylivna Bilokur (1900–1961), folk artist
 Manuil Shechtman (1900–1941), painter
 Mykola Hlushchenko (1901–1977), artist
 Donia Nachshen (1903–1987), illustrator and poster artist
 Misha Reznikoff (1905–1971), painter
 Fyodor Pavlovich Reshetnikov (1906–1988), painter
 Ivan Cherinko (1908–1948), painter and co-founder of Sh. Rustaveli Turkmen Art School
 Mychajlo Dmytrenko (1908–1997), painter
 Maria Prymachenko (1908–1997), folk artist
 Sergey Lunov (1909–1978), graphic artist
 Michael Kmit (1910–1981), painter
 Fedir Manailo (1910–1978), artist
 Felix Lembersky (1913–1970), painter
 Boris Nesterenko (1914–1988), painter
 Jacques Hnizdovsky (1915–1985), painter, printmaker
 Peter Kapschutschenko (1915-2006), sculptor
 Nikolai Getman (1917–2004), painter
 Yevhen Yehorov (1917–2004), graphic artist
 Tetyana Yablonska (1917–2005), painter
 Mykhaylo Khmelko (1919–1996), painter
 Fyodor Zakharov (1919–1994), painter
 Pyotr Ilyich Bilan (1921–1996), painter and illustrator
 Eugene Garin (1922–1994), seascape painter
 Vladimir Sosnovsky (1922–1990), landscape painter
 Liuboslav Hutsaliuk (1923–2003), painter, graphic artist
 Evgeniy Chuikov (1924–2000), landscape painter
 Anatoliy Nasedkin (1924–1994), painter
 Valentin Galochkin (1928–2006), sculptor
 Michael Matusevitch (1929–2007), painter
 Halyna Zubchenko (1929–2000), painter, muralist
 Leonid Mezheritski (1930–2007), painter
 Emma Andijewska (born 1931), poet and painter
 Oksana Zhnikrup (1931–1993), ceramicist
 Mykhaylo Chornyi (born 1933), genre painter
 Myroslava Kot (1933–2014), applied arts
 Mikhail Turovsky (born 1933), painter, writer
 Mykola Lebid (1936–2007), painter, graphic artist, designer
 Oles Semernya (1936–2012), Ukrainian naïve painter
 Ivan Marchuk (born 1936), painter
 Sychev, Stanislav I. (1937–2003), painter
 Mykola Ivanovych Tseluiko (1937–2007), painter, textile artist
 Roman Bezpalkiv (1938–2009), painter
 Eduard Gudzenko (1938–2009), painter
 Oleg Minko (1938–2013), painter, teacher
 Mykola Shmatko (1943–2020), sculptor
 Anton Solomoukha (1945–2015), painter, photographer
 Borys Fedorenko (1946–2012), painter
 Mickola Vorokhta (born 1947), painter
 Alexander Aksinin (1949–1985), printmaker, painter

Born 1950 to present 
 Viktor Kryzhanovsky (1950–2016), painter
 Yevgeniy Prokopov (born 1950), sculptor
 Nikolai Bartossik (born 1951), painter, monumental artist
 Volodymyr Harbuz (born 1951), painter, graphic artist
 Nicholas Zalevsky(born 1951), painter, graphic artist
 Olena Golub (born 1951), painter, digital artist
 Les Podervyansky (born 1952), painter, playwright
 Sergei Sviatchenko (born 1952), visual artist
 Borys Buryak (born 1953), painter
 Vasiliy Ryabchenko (born 1954), painter, graphic artist, photographer, author of objects and installations
 Victoria Kovalchuk (1954–2021), graphic artist
 Alexander Kostetsky (1954–2010), painter, graphic artist
 Viktor Burduk (born 1957), sculptor
 Matvei Vaisberg (born 1958), painter, graphic artist and book designer
 Alexandr Guristyuk (born 1959), painter
 Roman Turovsky-Savchuk (born 1961), painter, composer
 Oleksandr Miroshnikov (born 1962), stone-carver, jeweler
 Ihor Podolchak (born 1962), filmmaker, visual artist
 Anna Ivanovna Petrova (born 1962), muralist
 Marina Skugareva (born 1962), painter
  Glib Vysheslavsky(born 1962), painter, new media artist
 Oleg Kharch (born 1963), painter, collage, street artist
 Giennadij Jerszow (born 1967), sculptor
 Vlada Ralko (born 1969), painter
 Yelena Yemchuk (born 1970), painter, photographer
 Aljoscha (born 1974), artist
 Alisa Margolis (born 1975), artist
 Boris Krylov (born 1976), sculptor
 Anastasiya Markovich (born 1979), painter
 Alexander Milov (born 1979) artist and sculptor from Odessa
 Olesya Hudyma (born 1980), painter
 Anatolii Sloiko (born 1980), artist and curator
 Katerina Omelchuk (born 1982), painter
 Stepan Ryabchenko (born 1987), new media artist, sculptor, architect

See also 
 List of Ukrainian painters

References 

Artists

Ukrainian artists